Zvi Segal (1901–1965) was a Revisionist Zionist activist and a signatory of the Israeli declaration of independence.

A member of the Irgun, Segal was deported to Eritrea by the British during the Mandate era. He served as vice-president of the Revisionist movement from 1940 until 1948, when he signed Israel's declaration of independence. He was immediately co-opted into the Provisional State Council and sat on the finance committee; however, after Menachem Begin founded the rival Herut movement, Segal left politics and turned to the real estate business.

References

Signatories of the Israeli Declaration of Independence
Irgun members
Burials at Trumpeldor Cemetery
1901 births
1965 deaths